

Buildings and structures

Buildings

 Tangermünde Rathaus built.
 1431 – Collegiate Church of St Peter & St Paul, Lingfield, Surrey, England, rebuilt.
 c. 1435 – Hoshang Shah tomb, Mandav, construction begins.
 1436: August 30 – Brunelleschi's Dome at Florence Cathedral dedicated.
 1439 – Strasbourg Cathedral completed.

Births
 c. 1430 – Luca Fancelli born in Settignano, near Florence (died c. 1494)
 c. 1433 – Fra Giovanni Giocondo born in Verona (d. 1515)
 1439 – Francesco di Giorgio born in Siena (died 1502)

Deaths
 c. 1439 – Richard Winchcombe, English master mason

References

Architecture